Devon House, built in 1881, is the former residence of George Stiebel (1820–1896), Jamaica's first black millionaire, in St. Andrew. He gained his wealth in Venezuela and returned to Jamaica. He was appointed as the Custos, a high civic post, of St. Andrew. His residence has been restored and is operated as a house museum and National Heritage Site.

See also
 Tourism in Jamaica

References

Buildings and structures in Saint Andrew Parish, Jamaica
National Heritage Sites in Jamaica
Georgian architecture